Distorted World is a Russian darkwave/industrial band formed in 2010.

Biography 

Distorted World was founded in 2010 in Moscow as a side-project by former keyboardist of Anthracitic Moths, Ivan M. A year later, Angelina L. entered the project with her vocals. To date, the band have released the albums Between the Strophes (2012, Artificial Sun) and Shadow Empire (2014, Insane Records), the single "Personal Necropolis" (2013, Artificial Sun) and the web EP Drowning (2016, Insane Records).

Its music is gothic-industrial and includes harsh male and clean female vocals, synthesizers, orchestrations, analog basslines and a strong mid-tempo beat.

Band members 
Ivan M. - vocals, lyrics
Angelina L. - vocals, lyrics

Discography

Albums 
2012: Between the Strophes (Artificial Sun)
2014: Shadow Empire (Insane Records)
2017: Storm and Silence (Insane Records)

Singles and EPs 
2013: "Personal Necropolis" (Artificial Sun)
2016: Drowning (web EP) (Insane Records)

Compilation appearances 
2012: V/A - Infraschall Vol. 2
2012: V/A - Mister S's Hidden Corners of Mind
2013: V/A – Russian Industrial Tribute to Die Krupps
2013: V/A -   v4.0
2013: V/A - Digital Recovery Part 7
2014: V/A - Elektrozorn Vol. I
 V/A - Infraschall Vol. 6
2015: V/A – Terror Night Vol. 1 Industrial Madness
2015: V/A - Post-Cyberpunk 2015 (Cyberpunk.Argentina.Netlabel)
2015: V/A - Side-Line, Face the Beat: Session 3
2016: V/A - Hellektro Compilation 1 (Hellektro Records)

References

External links 
 
 Insane Records

Russian industrial music groups
Musical groups established in 2010
Russian musical duos
2010 establishments in Russia